Kasun (Sinhala: කසුන්) is a Sri Lankan given name, and an occasional surname that may refer to the following notable people:
Given name
Kasun Abeyrathne (born 1998), Sri Lankan cricketer
Kasun Caldera (born 1992), Sri Lankan cricketer
Kasun Ekanayake (born 1997), Sri Lankan cricketer
Kasun Jayasuriya (born 1980), Sri Lankan football player 
Kasun Kalhara (born 1981), Sri Lankan singer and musician
Kasun Madushanka (born 1991), Sri Lankan cricketer
Kasun Rajitha (born 1993), Sri Lankan cricketer
Kasun de Silva (born 1990), Sri Lankan cricketer
Kasun Vidura (born 1993), Sri Lankan cricketer

Surname
Mario Kasun (born 1980), Croatian basketball player 
Umesh Kasun (born 1996), Sri Lankan cricketer

Sinhalese masculine given names
Sinhalese surnames